Kongo is a small town in western Liberia on the border with Sierra Leone.  It serves an iron ore mine, with a narrow gauge railway, which are currently out of use.  There are similar iron ore deposits across the Mana River (West Africa) which forms the border.

See also 

 Railway stations in Liberia

References 

Populated places in Liberia